Mapother is a surname. Notable people with the surname include:

Edward Mapother (1881–1940), British psychiatrist
Thomas Cruise Mapother IV, also known as Tom Cruise (born 1962), American actor and producer
William Mapother (born 1965), American actor